Harry Watkins may refer to:

Harry Evans Watkins (1898–1963), United States federal judge
Harry Vaughan Watkins (1875–1945), Welsh international rugby union player
Harry Watkins (actor) (1825–1894), American actor

See also
Henry Watkins (disambiguation)